Ceres is an 18th-century statuette by Augustin Pajou depicting Ceres, a Roman goddess. The work, made from terracotta, was intended as a model for a larger marble sculpture, Four Seasons. Ceres is now in the collection of the Metropolitan Museum of Art.

References 

18th-century sculptures
Sculptures of the Metropolitan Museum of Art
Sculptures of Roman goddesses
Ceres (mythology)